Domhnall mac Dáire Mac Bruaideadha (fl. c. 1600) was an Irish poet.

A brother of Tadhg mac Dáire Mac Bruaideadha (1570–1652), Domhnall is known as the composer of Ceolchair sin a chruit an riogh ...

Also refer List of Irish poets and Irish poetry

External links
 Gleanings from Irish manuscripts, National Library of Scotland

MacBrody family
16th-century Irish writers
17th-century Irish writers
Irish-language poets
People from County Clare